The women's 100 metres hurdles competition at the 2018 Asian Games took place on 25 and 26 August 2018 at the Gelora Bung Karno Stadium.

Schedule
All times are Western Indonesia Time (UTC+07:00)

Records

Results
Legend
DSQ — Disqualified

Round 1
 Qualification: First 2 in each heat (Q) and the next 2 fastest (q) advance to the final.

Heat 1 
 Wind: +0.4 m/s

Heat 2 
 Wind: +0.8 m/s

Heat 3 
 Wind: −0.7 m/s

Final
 Wind: +0.2 m/s

References

External links
Results

Women's 100 metres hurdles
2018 women